Miltochrista flexuosa is a moth of the family Erebidae. It was described by John Henry Leech in 1899. It is found in western China.

References

flexuosa
Moths described in 1899
Moths of Asia